"I Only Know I Love You" is a 1956 popular song produced by Carlo Alberto Rossi, Al Stillman, and Ugo Calise and performed by the Four Aces, whose version peaked at No. 22 on the Billboard Top 100 singles chart. The single was released on the B side of the record with the A side containing A Woman in Love.

Weekly charts

References

The Four Aces songs
Decca Records singles
1956 singles
1956 songs
Songs with lyrics by Al Stillman